Abra-Catastrophe! is a television film initially released as the seventh, eighth, and ninth episodes of the third season of The Fairly OddParents. It was originally broadcast on Nickelodeon in the United States on July 12, 2003.

Plot
All the fairies in Fairy World celebrate Timmy Turner's "Fairy-versary", a celebration of a godchild keeping his/her fairy godparents a secret for an entire year. Fairy godparent academy instructor Jorgen Von Strangle gives Timmy a magical muffin that allows anyone who eats it to have a "rule-free" wish. Timmy then asks how Cosmo and Wanda became his godparents. Wanda shows through a flashback that his parents lied to an 8-year-old Timmy and tricked him into hiring Vicky as his babysitter. Upset, Timmy inadvertently wishes that his parents could tell the truth. Mr. and Mrs. Turner begin to feel guilty, and they start counting the many times they have lied to Timmy.

Timmy takes the muffin to school but is followed by his fairy-obsessed teacher, Mr. Crocker, who detects the magic within the muffin. Crocker attempts to retrieve the muffin, but only gets it out of Timmy's possession. During "muffin day" at lunch, Timmy sees Crocker frantically searching for the muffin and creates a diversion with a food fight. Bippy, a monkey that Timmy sets free, takes a bite out of the muffin. Suddenly, the whole world is transformed, making monkeys and apes the dominant species of life. Consequently, all fairy godparents are assigned to primate children, with Cosmo and Wanda assigned to Bippy.

Waking up in a treehouse version of his hometown, Timmy returns to school and witnesses Crocker being abducted by ape overlords for saying he plans to use fairy magic to overthrow them. Using a magic detector stolen from the "Crocker Cave", he tracks down Bippy, still in possession of the muffin. Timmy almost succeeds in retrieving the muffin but is captured by the ape overlords and brought to a human testing center. He is taken to a surgical room, where the ape overlords try to operate on his skull, but Bippy fights to save him, then wishes away the monkey world.

Timmy discovers that Bippy lost the muffin during the scuffle, and immediately after the world is returned to normal, Crocker takes a bite from the muffin and wishes he could catch a fairy. He obtains a butterfly net, one of the few items fairy magic has no effect on, and captures Wanda. Timmy, knowing that Crocker will boast about his capture to his students, hurries back to school. With his new-found power, Crocker terrorizes his students with a scepter holding Wanda hostage, then chases Timmy off as he transforms the world and makes himself the all-powerful magical leader. Word spreads to Fairy World, so Jorgen scrambles the fairies for war and symbolically destroys their homeworld's rainbow bridge to Earth.

Timmy arms himself with various gifts from his Fairy-versary party and, disguised as a masked hero, engages Crocker in a magical duel. Crocker has the upper hand until Cosmo returns with greatly improved strength from an exercise video and overpowers him. However, Cosmo lets his guard down and is captured as well. Timmy and Crocker fight through time and space before Timmy's cover is blown. Realizing he cannot destroy Timmy with magic, Crocker decides to threaten his parents. Returning home, Timmy, now captured by Crocker, sees his parents under the mercy of his teacher and surrenders. As he reconciles with his parents, he reveals that Cosmo and Wanda are his fairy godparents, causing them to be vacuumed out of Crocker's possession back to Fairy World as Timmy broke the sacred cardinal law of Da Rules by admitting he had fairy godparents. With Crocker now powerless, Mr. and Mrs. Turner pummel him, knocking the muffin out of his possession. Timmy grabs and eats the rest of the muffin, then wishes for his godparents to return and for everything to be restored to normal.

Back at school, Crocker attempts to convince everyone that fairies exist before being sedated and escorted to a mental institution. Jorgen shows up in Timmy's room, still seeking to take Cosmo and Wanda away as punishment for Timmy revealing his secret, but Timmy throws a "Forget-Me-Knob" at Jorgen's head, causing him to forget what he was doing. Cosmo and Wanda then trick him into "assigning" Timmy as their godchild, then reenact their first meeting with Timmy. Fairy World's rainbow bridge is restored, and Crocker hears the fairies' cheers from within the institution, only for Timmy and his fairies to sedate him again.

Cast
Tara Strong as Timmy Turner / Kid
Daran Norris as Cosmo / Mr. Turner / Jorgen Von Strangle
Susanne Blakeslee as Wanda / Mrs. Turner
Carlos Alazraqui as Denzel Crocker / Ape
Grey DeLisle as Vicky / Principal Waxelplax / Tootie / Flashback Fairy
Dee Bradley Baker as Bippy / Sanjay / Elmer / Kid / Fairy Private
Tom Kenny as Cupid / Muffin Man / Kid / Fairy Sergeant / Flashback Fairy
Jason Marsden as Chester McBadbat
Gary LeRoi Gray as A.J.
Robert Costanzo as Easter Bunny / Construction Worker Ape / Ape Truck Driver
Faith Abrahams as Francis / Ape
Butch Hartman as Flashback Boy / Web-Eared Guy / Third Kid / Orderly
Cara Newman Ruyle as Flashback Girl / Female Ape #1 / Gorilla Business Woman
Jim Ward as Chet Ubetcha
Gary Le Mel as Fairy Cowlick Jr. (voice)
Kevin Michael Richardson as Bad Guy / Business Man

Release
"Abra-Catastrophe!" premiered on July 12, 2003. Attracting over 4 million views, the television film was the highest rated film on basic cable on the week it premiered. "Abra-Catastrophe" was released on a DVD and VHS tape of the same name on July 15, 2003, by Nickelodeon and Paramount Home Entertainment. The DVD version includes the episode itself and some bonus materials. It was also put on the season 3 DVD in 2011.

Reception
On the day of its premiere, Robert Lloyd of the Los Angeles Times claimed that the film was "fun for the whole family", praising it for its moments of suspense as well as its references to popular culture. Jason Bovberg of DVD Talk criticized the film for its loud tone, although he praised the imaginative final act.

References

The Fairly OddParents films
2003 television films
2003 films
2000s American animated films
Television episodes about parallel universes
American children's animated comedy films
American children's animated fantasy films
American flash animated films
Animated films about children